Slavery in the Bahamas dates back several centuries.

19th century

Golden Grove uprising
In December 1831, a slave riot occurred on the estate of Joseph Hunter, who had the largest slave holdings on Golden Grove. Although the Consolidated Slave Act of 1797 stated that all slaves were entitled to rest on Christmas and the next two working days, Christmas in 1831 was on a Sunday which had already been an official rest day for slaves since 1830. Therefore, it was up to their owners to determine when their one outstanding rest day would be repaid. However, Hunter's slaves were displeased with his designation of the Saturday before Christmas week as their rest day; they continued to work on Saturday, collecting their Christmas allowances on Sunday instead, and demanded that Wednesday be their holiday. At the direction of senior slave "Black Dick" Deveaux, the slaves defied Hunter's orders to harvest corn on Wednesday and some were even accused by Hunter of stealing fruit. On 30 December, Black Dick, his sons, Wally and Richard, and the other slaves surrounded the Hunter estate; Black Dick and his sons were armed with muskets, although slaves were not permitted by law to bear firearms. A shootout ensued with no fatalities and the rebellion lasted for three days, while Hunter made preparations to leave for Nassau in early January 1832. The perpetrators were subsequently arrested by the Second West India Regiment led and trialed on 25 January 1832; Black Dick and six other slaves were sentenced to death by hanging.

The end of slavery
Slavery was legally ended in all British colonies in 1833. The Creole case of 7 November 1841, which has been described as "the most successful revolt of enslaved people in U.S. history", a mutiny occurred on the New Orleans-bound Creole, which was transporting some 135 slaves from Richmond, Virginia. After wounding the captain and killing one of the slave traders, the mutineers navigated the ship to the Bahamas, where all the slaves onboard ultimately found their freedom.

Modern era
In 1992, the Pompey Museum of Slavery and Emancipation, named after "a courageous slave, Pompey, who lived on the Rolle Plantation on Steventon, Exuma", was established at the former Vendue House marketplace at Bay Street, Nassau. In October 2013, following a Caribbean Community (CARICOM) meeting on reparations in Saint Vincent and the Grenadines, the Bahamas joined 13 other CARICOM states in formally demanding slavery compensation from Britain, Holland, and France.

References

Citations

Bibliography

 

Slavery in the British West Indies
Slavery by country
19th century in the Bahamas